Thekkekara is a village in Alappuzha district in the Indian state of Kerala.The village is situated in mavelikara south.

Demographics
 census, Thekkekara had a population of 31,747 with 14,873 males and 16,874 females.

Geography

Services

Post Office
State bank of India
Union bank of India
Federal bank
Village office
Government Hospital
Panchayath office
Government Higher Secondary School
Pentecostal Church: Carmel Assembly of God Church Kurathikad, located in Pallikkal East.(9633335211)
Vathikulangara Devi Temple
Mullikulangara Devi Temple
Umbarnadu Sree Dharma Shastha Temple
Pallarimangalam Sree Krishnaswami Temple
Malimel Bhagavathi Temple

References

Villages in Alappuzha district